Martín Dopazo (born 13 March 1969) is an Argentine equestrian. He competed at the 2000 Summer Olympics and the 2004 Summer Olympics. He won the Platinum Konex Award in 2010 as the best equestrian of the last decade in Argentina. He also competed at the 2020 Summer Olympics.

References

External links
 

1969 births
Living people
Argentine male equestrians
Olympic equestrians of Argentina
Equestrians at the 2000 Summer Olympics
Equestrians at the 2004 Summer Olympics
Equestrians at the 1999 Pan American Games
Equestrians at the 2003 Pan American Games
Equestrians at the 2007 Pan American Games
Equestrians at the 2011 Pan American Games
Equestrians at the 2019 Pan American Games
Place of birth missing (living people)
Pan American Games competitors for Argentina
Equestrians at the 2020 Summer Olympics
South American Games silver medalists for Argentina
South American Games bronze medalists for Argentina
Competitors at the 2006 South American Games
Competitors at the 2014 South American Games
Competitors at the 2022 South American Games